Kurup is a 2021 Indian Malayalam-language biographical crime thriller film based on fugitive Sukumara Kurup. Produced by Dulquer Salmaan and directed by Srinath Rajendran, it stars Dulquer Salmaan in the title role with an ensemble cast including Indrajith Sukumaran, Shine Tom Chacko, Sunny Wayne, Sobhita Dhulipala, Bharath, Tovino Thomas, Shivajith, Vijayaraghavan, Vijaykumar Prabhakaran, Saiju Kurup and Anupama Parameswaran.

Kurup was theatrically released on 4 November 2021, during Diwali, and became the first Indian film to have non-fungible token (NFT) collectibles. Kurup received critical acclaim with praise for the score, production design, characterization and performances (particularly Salmaan, Sukumaran and Chacko). A critical and commercial success, it grossed over  worldwide, and is among the highest-grossing Malayalam films of all time.

Plot

Krishnadas, a former SP of Kerala Police, has just retired and prepares to attend a send-off event arranged by his colleagues when a subordinate officer, CI Praveen arrives to inform him that an IB report has warned against the arrival of a criminal. Upon knowing that Das is retiring, the officer glances through the former's cupboard to find one of his case diaries (titled "Kurup"). Krishnadas is mostly known as the officer who investigated the famous Charlie murder case long back when he was a DYSP, which paved way for a still-untraced fugitive named Sudhakara Kurup. As the officer reads through the diary, the story of Kurup unfolds on screen.

Born as Gopikrishna Kurup, Kurup is sent to the Indian Air Force forcibly by his uncle after he fails to acquire his degree. At the IAF, he meets and befriends Peter who was also forcibly made to join the IAF despite his passion for music. Weeks later, Peter and Kurup along with some other inmates are sent to Bombay by the Air Force. There, Peter starts liking his new life while Kurup meets and befriends Sharadamma, who is the daughter of his family's old maid and falls in love with her. Later, Peter is informed that Kurup, who was hospitalized days ago, has committed suicide. He informs the same to Sharada. However, Sharada gets the message that Kurup is still alive and meets him in a subway, wherein Kurup announces the new name he currently lives under, Sudhakara Kurup. Kurup apparently created his death to escape the tedious life in the force. He soon marries Sharada and they leave for Persia, starting a new life there. However, further problems lead Kurup to hasty decisions and he leaves to his hometown along with his office clerk and right-hand man Sabu (Shivajith).

In Kerala, Pillechan Bhasippilla  who is Kurup's co-brother (Sharada's brother-in-law) and Ponnachan who is Kurup's personal driver in Allepey, welcome Kurup and Sabu. Kurup discusses a plan he made with the three other men - that he has applied for life insurance under his own name and an amount of Rs 8 Lakh can be obtained if Kurup's death was proved. Kurup decides to fake his own death and offers the three men an equal share of the insurance money. For this, they require a corpse that matches Kurup's physique. After searching a lot for corpses matching Kurup's height and weight, Pillechan puts forward the idea of killing someone who matches their requirements after spotting a bartender who resembles Kurup in height and style. However, Pillechan's attempt to abduct the bartender backfires and the men end up quarrelling with Kurup.

The next day, an Ambassador car is found apparently involved in an accident and burnt badly next to a paddy field. A charred and killed person is found in the driver's seat. The police team headed by DYSP Krishnadas arrives and starts investigating. The car is identified to be that of Kurup. However, Das spots match, gloves and footsteps at the site, thereby confirming that it wasn't an accident but a murder. Das questions Pillechan which makes him suspicious of the latter. Das finds out burnt marks in Pillechan's body and takes him into custody. In custody, Pillechan admits that he had murdered Kurup due to a long-standing rivalry.

However, the experienced Das easily finds that Pillai is lying. He asks his colleagues to cross-check recent man-missing cases that lead him to the house of Charlie, a film distribution company staff. Charlie's wife identifies cloth remnants from the charred body which belong to Charlie, making it clear that Charlie was the one murdered and burnt (and not Kurup). Pillai is tortured in custody till he confesses that the four of them found the perfect victim in Charlie and subsequently murdered and burnt him along with Kurup's car, to fabricate Kurup's death.

Sabu and Ponnachan are also arrested. The missing Kurup is hiding at a lodge and a room boy informs the police about the same. However, the police is unable to trace him. Despite getting to know Kurup's exact route - Allepey to Ernakulam, then to his uncle at Mannar, further to his relative at Bhopal and finally to Sharada's aunt at Bombay - Das and his team miss Kurup each time. However, Das is ultimately able to find Isaac, Kurup's long-time friend with whom he was spotted by a peon, who informs the police. Isaac refuses to reveal Kurup's plan, but Das is able to connect the dots and finds that Kurup is planning to migrate via a cruise ship. However, Kurup slips away even this time and escapes on the cruise.

Das's case diary then tries to give more clarity to the incidents. It is revealed that while in Bombay, Kurup was driven by greed - which stirred his mind right during his IAF days - that led him into the smuggling of the force's arms which were pending post the war. He forms a smuggling setup with Isaac, then his close friend and Leo, a gangster. After creating many alterations, Kurup gets the need to evade capture and decides to fake his death for the first time. Kurup (then Gopikrishna) fakes his death and changes to Sudhakara Kurup with his family knowing about it. The propaganda is swiftly spread by Kurup's friend who is a cop.

Next, after marrying Sharada, both leaves for Persia where they lead a luxurious life. Kurup meets with Leo who leads him to Prince Walid, son of the emperor. Walid is impressed by Kurup. Kurup is assigned by Walid to smuggle precious crude oil without the knowledge of the former's father. However, Kurup's greed resurfaces and combined with Walid's ill-treatment, he decides to rob a high amount from Walid and then fakes his own death once again to evade Walid. The insurance was arranged only as a part of this big plan and Kurup with the help of his team in Kerala kills Charlie to fake Kurup's death. However, this time his plans go awry, thanks to an efficient Das.

It is then revealed that Kurup was hiding right above the room when Das and his team arrived to arrest him at the lodge. He further hides at his aforementioned places in Bhopal and Bombay before planning to escape on the cruise (with the help of Leo). He even joins the police team disguised as a driver shortly before evading Das's eye and getting into the cruise, but Das is informed by Walid about Kurup's treachery beforehand. Das and Walid join hands against their common enemy. As the cruise leaves and Das find that Kurup is in it, the former immediately informs Walid about the same. Meanwhile, Kurup meets Leo and is assigned a new name 'Alexander' and a new passport. Once Kurup (now Alexander) walks out, he is called "Alexander" by Walid, who along with his bodyguards plans to kill Kurup. Das, confirming that Kurup will be killed, informs Charlie's family that he has avenged the person who is responsible for their condition. A few years later, Das gets conferred as an IPS officer and is given the rank of Superintendent of Police.

At the end of the ceremony, Das leaves the office, before which the officer who was reading his diary hands it to Das and salutes him respectfully. Das, leaving his official life behind and believing that Kurup is no more, leaves the office and the moment he leaves, a cop receives fax showing a lookout notice of an international criminal who is shown to be none other than Kurup. In the epilogue, it is shown that when Alexander was stopped by Walid, he just smiles to the camera and a newspaper story showing Walid's death in a car accident follows, indirectly suggesting that Alexander had set a plan B with Leo's help to end Walid in case he spotted him in the cruise. Various news stories and channel clips of the police searching all around the world for Alexander follow. Back to the present, in a busy street in Helsinki in 2005, Alexander is spotted and photographed by a person who works for the police. Upon realizing that he is being photographed, Alexander kills the photographer.

Cast

Production

Development
In mid-2018, Dulquer Salmaan announced the title of the film through social media, directed by Srinath Rajendran which marks their second collaboration after their debut film Second Show. Rajendran stated that it took five years of research to get the film on the floors. The film is about one of the most wanted criminals in Kerala, Sukumara Kurup. He murdered Chacko, a man of similar appearance, in order to falsify his own death and claim insurance money.

The film, which is backed by Dulquer Salmaan's home banner Wayfarer Films is jointly producing Kurup with M-Star Entertainments. The entire production process took six months with the shoot alone taking up 105 days. The locations include Kerala, Mumbai, Dubai, Mangalore, Mysuru, Gujarat and Ahmedabad.

Filming
Principal photography began on 1 September 2019 with a customary pooja function held at Palakkad, Kerala. Indrajith Sukumaran joined set the sets on 7 September 2019. Sobhita Dhulipala joined the sets on 21 September 2019. The first schedule was wrapped on 23 September 2019 with completing all the shoots in Kerala. The second schedule was held in Mumbai and Ahmedabad. In mid-November 2019, Dulquer Salmaan joined the shooting in Dubai. The final schedule of the film shooting was held in Mangalore. Filming was wrapped on 23 February 2020.

Music

Songs 
The songs were composed by Sushin Shyam, Sulaiman Kakkodan and Leo Tom, produced and arranged by Sushin Shyam. The song Dingiri Dingale is a recreation of the same name song from the 1958 Tamil film Anbu Engey.

Original version 
Malayalam (Kurup)

Dubbed versions 
Tamil (Kurup)
Telugu (Kurup)
Kannada (Kurup)
Hindi (Kurup)

Original soundtrack 
The original soundtrack is composed and produced by Sushin Shyam.

Release

Theatrical
Kurup was planned to release in May 2021 but due to COVID-19 second wave lockdown this movie was postponed. The film was released in theatres on 12 November 2021. The movie was released in Malayalam along with dubbed versions in Tamil, Telugu, Hindi and Kannada.

Marketing
Kurup became the first Indian film to release a series of NFTs as part of the promotion. As part of the promotion, film merchandise was also released. A pre-release event had taken place at Hyderabad on 9 November 2021. Ahead of the film's screening, the visuals and the trailer shots were showcased at Burj Khalifa, Dubai on 10 November 2021, which is the first time for a Malayalam film.

Reception

Critical response 

The Times of India gave a rating of 3.5 on 5 while praising the score and wrote that, "The story is a tough one to tell, but the makers keep you on the edge of the seat, even when the narration goes back and forth in time to chart Kurup’s mysterious misdeeds." S. R. Praveen of The Hindu commented that, "Dulquer Salman’s crime biopic takes too many liberties with a real-life story. One of the things the film gets right is the production design, especially in scenes set in the bygone era, with tastefully-done recreations of the 1970s and 80s." Sify rated the movie with 3.5 on 5 and said that, "Kurup is not an easy film to make considering almost everyone knows the facts and the fables that the story is based on. Still it is to be applauded that this has been made into a gripping adventure drama."

Hindustan Times wrote that, "Kurup, a compelling crime drama, attempts to narrate the story of the notorious, elusive criminal in the most realistic fashion while taking certain cinematic liberties. Spanning over three decades, Kurup manages to impress, especially in recreating the mood of the times. Dulquer Salmaan plays the elusive fugitive with swag and sincerity in this Srinath Rajendran film." Sajin Srijith of The New Indian Express wrote that, "Kurup' movie is a stunningly designed, globe-trotting crime epic. Every frame in this film looks like a million bucks. Its top-notch production value is on par with anything seen in Hollywood. The real star of the film is Shine Tom Chacko as Kurup’s accomplice, Bhasi Pillai. If you thought you saw all the dimensions of the actor before, wait till you see this one.

Manoj Kumar of The Indian Express gave the film a 2.5 out of 5 writing "It is criminal that the filmmakers have tucked away a compelling idea about a larger-than-life wicked phantom in the footnote of the movie. Towards the end, Kurup takes the shape of an urban mythical character. " News18 gave a positive review from the film, praising the cast especially Shine Tom Chacko's performance in addition to narration, music, background elements and climax. A reviewer from The News Minute criticised for the characterization of Kurup.

Accolades

References

External links
 

2021 films
Indian crime thriller films
Films set in the 1980s
Indian biographical drama films
Films postponed due to the COVID-19 pandemic
2020s Malayalam-language films
Films shot in Dubai
Films shot in Mumbai
Films shot in Kerala
Films shot in Ahmedabad
Films shot in Gujarat
Films shot in Mysore
Films shot in Mangalore
Films shot in Palakkad
Films shot in Thrissur
Indian films based on actual events
Indian crime drama films
Fictional portrayals of the Kerala Police
Films about organised crime in India
Cultural depictions of Indian men
Films scored by Sushin Shyam